Mexico Ingles Airplay is a record chart published weekly by Billboard magazine for English-language singles receiving airplay in Mexico. According to Billboards electronic database, the first chart was published on October 1, 2011 with "Party Rock Anthem" by American hip-hop electronic dance duo LMFAO featuring Lauren Bennett and GoonRock, which also peaked at number-one in the American Billboard Hot 100. Three songs by English singer-songwriter Adele peaked at the top of the charts in Mexico and the United States, "Someone like You", "Set Fire to the Rain", and "Hello". Grammy-winning song "We Are Young" by American band fun. featuring Janelle Monáe, was a number-one song in Mexico, the United Kingdom, and the United States after being featured in the TV series Glee and a commercial for Chevrolet that aired during the Super Bowl of 2012. American band Maroon 5 and Scottish DJ Calvin Harris hold the record for most number-one singles in the Mexico Ingles Airplay chart, with seven each.

In 2013, American artist Miley Cyrus spent nine non-consecutive weeks at number-one in the Mexico Ingles Airplay chart with "Wrecking Ball", for which she was awarded the MTV Video Music Award for Video of the Year. "Happy" by American singer-songwriter Pharrell Williams also was a number-one hit in Mexico, received a nomination for an Academy Award for Best Original Song, and was declared the most successful song of 2014, with 13.9 million units sold worldwide, according to the International Federation of the Phonographic Industry. "Boom Clap" by English singer Charli XCX was featured in the 2014 film The Fault in Our Stars and reached number-one in Mexico. The collaborative single by English producer Mark Ronson featuring singer Bruno Mars, titled "Uptown Funk", topped the Mexican chart and ended as the best-performing single of 2015 in the United States. "7 Years" by Danish band Lukas Graham reached number-one in Australia, Mexico and the United Kingdom in 2016. American singer-songwriter Charlie Puth debuted at the top of the chart in November 2017, with the song "How Long".

Number ones

Artists with most number-one singles

Notes

References

Billboard charts
Lists of number-one songs in Mexico
Mexican record charts